The Seoul City in South Korea plans to build up to ten new light metro, or light rapid transit (LRT).  They would be connected to the Seoul Metropolitan Subway giving access to several hundred subway stations. As opposed to traditional subway lines, LRT lines have a lower capacity.

Ui Line

In September 2017, Seoul City opened a  light subway line (Ui LRT) from Ui-dong to Sinseol-dong in northeastern Seoul. The line was expected to carry 110,000 passengers a day and will have 13 stations. It connects to Line 4 at Sungshin Women's University, Line 6 at Bomun and Line 1 & 2 at Sinseol Dong.

Sillim Line

Sillim LRT (신림선 경전철) is an 11 station 7.8 km line from Saetgang Station to Gwanaksan Station. Customers can transfer to Seoul Subway Lines 1, 2, 7, and 9. Construction began in 2017 and it opened on 28 May 2022.

Dongbuk Line 

Dongbuk LRT is an under construction 16 station 13.4 km long line. The line starts from Wangsimni station and heads northeast to Sanggye station. Construction started in 2019 and completion is scheduled for 2025.

Under planning 

 Gangbukhoengdan Line
 Myeonmok Line
 Mok-dong Line

References 

Rapid transit in South Korea
Proposed public transport in South Korea